BenBella Books is an independent publishing house based in Dallas, Texas. BenBella was founded by Glenn Yeffeth in 2001. It specializes in nonfiction books on popular culture, business, health, and nutrition, along with books on science, politics, psychology, and other topics.

BenBella Books has four imprints. The BenBella Books imprint publishes broadly in non-fiction.

The Smart Pop imprint, now headed by Robb Pearlman, originally focused on essay anthologies on popular culture but now focuses more broadly on fan-friendly titles.

The BenBella Vegan imprint focuses on plant-based cookbooks and lifestyle titles.

The Matt Holt imprint, launched in 2020, focuses on business, finance, and professional development titles.

Selected works

BenBella published the nutrition book The China Study by T. Colin Campbell in 2005, which has gone on to sell over 3 million copies.

The company published NYT bestseller Presumed Guilty: Casey Anthony: The Inside Story, written by defense attorney Jose Baez about the Casey Anthony trial, in 2013.

The company published Strange Beautiful Music: A Musical Memoir by guitarist Joe Satriani in May 2014, the Francis J. Greenburger autobiography Risk Game: Self-Portrait of an Entrepreneur in 2016, and in 2018, BenBella announced they will be publishing Nicole Lapin's third book, Becoming Super Woman.

The company published Murder in the Courthouse, a legal thriller by Nancy Grace, in 2016.

Titles include The Psychology of Harry Potter (2007), Grey's Anatomy 101 (2007), The Science of Dune (2008), and The Science of Michael Crichton (2008).

References

External links
 
 

Small press publishing companies
Companies based in Dallas
Book publishing companies based in Texas
Publishing companies established in 2001
2001 establishments in Texas